Chittora is a village and revenue block (ILRC) in Phagi Tehsil in Jaipur district, Rajasthan.

Based on a 2011 census, Chittora has a total population of 3,170 (53.53% male, 46.47% female) distributed among 392 households. The total area of the village is 23.69 km2.

References

Villages in Jaipur district